is a former Japanese football player.

Playing career
Terakawa was born in Hyogo Prefecture on September 6, 1974. After graduating from high school, he joined Yokohama Marinos in 1993. He debuted as central midfielder in 1995 and the club won the champions 1995 J1 League. However he could not become a regular player and he moved to JEF United Ichihara in 1999. In 2000, he moved to J2 League club Albirex Niigata. He became a regular player and played for the club in 3 seasons. In 2003, he moved to newly was promoted to J1 League club, Oita Trinita and played in all matches in 2003 season. In 2004, he returned to newly was promoted to J1 club, Albirex Niigata. He played for the club in 5 seasons. In 2009, he moved to J2 club Shonan Bellmare. He played in all matches in 2009 and the club was promoted to J1. In 2011, he moved to Japan Football League club FC Ryukyu. He retired end of 2012 season.

Club statistics

References

External links

1974 births
Living people
Association football people from Hyōgo Prefecture
Japanese footballers
J1 League players
J2 League players
Japan Football League players
Yokohama F. Marinos players
JEF United Chiba players
Albirex Niigata players
Oita Trinita players
Shonan Bellmare players
FC Ryukyu players
Association football midfielders